Jurczyk a surname. Notable people with the surname include:

Marc Jurczyk (born 1996), German male track cyclist
Marian Jurczyk (1935–2014), Polish politician and Solidarity trade union activist
Marius Jurczyk (born 1985), German-Polish footballer
Steve Jurczyk, Associate Administrator of NASA